Joseph John Daly   (September 21, 1868 – March 21, 1943) was a Major League Baseball outfielder and catcher. He later played in one game for the 1891 Cleveland Spiders and one game for the 1892 Boston Beaneaters.

His brother, Tom Daly, also played professional baseball.

External links

Major League Baseball outfielders
Major League Baseball catchers
19th-century baseball players
Philadelphia Athletics (AA) players
Cleveland Spiders players
Boston Beaneaters players
Baseball players from Philadelphia
1868 births
1943 deaths
Columbia Senators players
People from Conshohocken, Pennsylvania
Sportspeople from Montgomery County, Pennsylvania